Citizen Smith is a British sitcom that aired on BBC One between 12 April 1977 and 31 December 1980.  A total of 30 episodes were aired.

The pilot episode aired on 12 April 1977. The first series of eight episodes aired from 3 November to 15 December 1977 (apart from a Christmas special aired on 22 December 1977). The second series, of six episodes, was scheduled to air from 1 December 1978 to 5 January 1979, but the fifth episode was postponed due to industrial action, eventually being broadcast on 16 August 1979. The third series, of seven episodes, began on 20 September 1979 and ended on 1 November. The fourth and final series consisted of seven episodes, beginning on 23 May 1980 and ended on 4 July 1980.

The 1980 Christmas special is 30 minutes long and aired on 31 December 1980. All episodes were originally shown on BBC One.

Series overview

Episodes

Pilot (1977)

Series 1 (1977)

Christmas special (1977)

Series 2 (1978-79)

Series 3 (1979)

Series 4 (1980)

Christmas special (1980)

External links

Citizen Smith
Citizen Smith